Bulgaria competed at the 1964 Summer Olympics in Tokyo, Japan. 63 competitors, 56 men and 7 women, took part in 56 events in 9 sports.

Medalists

Gold
 Boyan Radev — Wrestling, Men's Greco-Roman Light Heavyweight.
 Enyu Valchev — Wrestling, Men's Freestyle Lightweight.
 Prodan Gardzhev — Wrestling, Men's Freestyle Middleweight.

Silver
 Velichko Velichkov — Shooting, Men's 50 metre Rifle, Three Positions
 Angel Kerezov — Wrestling, Men's Greco-Roman Flyweight
 Kiril Petkov — Wrestling, Men's Greco-Roman Welterweight
 Stancho Kolev — Wrestling, Men's Freestyle Featherweight
 Lyutvi Ahmedov — Wrestling, Men's Freestyle Heavyweight

Bronze
 Aleksandar Nikolov — Boxing, Men's Light Heavyweight
 Said Mustafov — Wrestling, Men's Freestyle Light Heavyweight

Athletics

Boxing

Canoeing

Sprint
Men

Women

Cycling

One cyclist represented Bulgaria in 1964. Stefan Kirev from Kazanlak.

Track
1000m time trial

Gymnastics

Shooting

Four shooters represented Bulgaria in 1964. Velichko Velichkov won the silver medal in the 50 m rifle, three positions event.
Men

Volleyball

Men

Round robin

|}

|}

Team Roster
 Dimitar Karov
 Ivan Gochev
 Gergi Konstandinov
 Petko Panteleev
 Peter Kruchmarov
 Simeon Srandev
 Lachezar Stoyanov
 Boris Gyuderov
 Kiril Ivanov
 Slavko Slavov
 Georgi Spasov
 Angel Koritarov

Weightlifting

Men

Wrestling

References

External links
Official Olympic Reports
International Olympic Committee results database

Nations at the 1964 Summer Olympics
1964
1964 in Bulgarian sport